Marabou can refer to:

 Marabou (chocolate), a Swedish chocolate brand
 Marabou (ethnicity), a historical term for a multiracial person in Haiti
 Marabou (weed), or el marabú in Cuba, the legume Dichrostachys cinerea
 Marabou stork, a large bird in the stork family Ciconiidae
 Marabou (fashion), downy feathers used as a fashion trimming. Historically known as "marabout."
 Marabou, a collection of poems by Nikos Kavvadias
 Marabou, a thrown silk typically dyed in the gum or a fabric made of said silk

See also
 Marabout, the Moroccan term for a Muslim holy man